Hasarius rufociliatus is a species of jumping spiders. The species is endemic to four islands in Seychelles: Curieuse, Mahé, Silhouette and Felicite.

References

Salticidae
Spiders described in 1898
Spiders of Africa
Endemic fauna of Seychelles